The glaciers of Chile cover 2.7% (20,188 km2) of the land area of the country, excluding Antártica Chilena, and have a considerable impact on its landscape and water supply. By surface 80% of South America's glaciers lie in Chile. Glaciers develop in the Andes of Chile from 27˚S southwards and in a very few places north of 18°30'S in the extreme north of the country: in between they are absent because of extreme aridity, though rock glaciers formed from permafrost are common. The largest glaciers of Chile are the Northern and Southern Patagonian Ice Fields. From a latitude of 47° S and south some glaciers reach sea level.

Apart from height and latitude, the settings of Chilean glaciers depend on precipitation patterns; in this sense two different regions exist: the Dry Andes and the Wet Andes.

List of ice fields
This is a list of the ice fields of Chile.
{| class="wikitable sortable"
!valign="bottom" align="left"|Name
!valign="bottom" align="right"|Area(km²)
!valign="bottom" align="left"|Regions of Chile 
!valign="bottom" align="left"|Coordinates
|-
| Northern Patagonian Ice Field || align="right"|4,200 || Aisén || align="right"|
|-
| Southern Patagonian Ice Field || align="right"|14,200 (of 16,800) || Aisén and Magallanes || align="right"|
|-
| Cordillera Darwin || align="right"|2,300 || Magallanes || align="right"|
|-
| Gran Campo Nevado || align="right"|200 || Magallanes || align="right"|
|-
| Grandes Ventisqueros || align="right"| || Magallanes || align="right"|

List of glaciers

North
 Tapado Glacier
 Tronquitos Glacier

Center
 Universidad Glacier
 Cipreses Glacier
 San Francisco Glacier
 Esmeralda Glacier
 Juncal Norte Glacier

South
 Garibaldi Glacier
 Schiaparelli Glacier
 Balmaceda Glacier
 Tyndall Glacier or Geike Glacier
 Grey Glacier
 Amalia Glacier
 Dickson Glacier
 Ameghino Glacier
 Speghazzini Glacier
 Upsala Glacier
 Viedma Glacier
 Southern Patagonian Ice Field
 Brüggen Glacier or Pío XI Glacier
 Chico Glacier
 O'Higgins Glacier
 Tempano Glacier
 Ofhidro Glacier
 Jorge Montt Glacier
 Steffen Glacier
 Colonia Glacier
 Nef Glacier
 Northern Patagonian Ice Field
 Soler Glacier
 San Quintín Glacier
 San Rafael Glacier
 Gualas Glacier
 Hudson Volcano
 Michinmahuida Volcano
 Blanco Chico Glacier
 Casa Pangue Glacier
 Villarrica Glacier
 Bernardo Glacier

(Following Glaciers aren't in the list of http://www.glaciologia.cl)

 Alemania Glacier
 Darwin Glacier
 Exploradores Glacier
 Francia Glacier
 Grandes Ventisqueros
 Gran Campo Nevado
 Holanda Glacier
 Italia Glacier
 La Paloma Glacier
 Leones Glacier
 Los Perros Glacier
 Marinelli Glacier
 Mocho-Choshuenco
 Patagonian Ice Sheet†
 Pingo Glacier
 Queulat Glacier
 Romanche Glacier
 Serrano Glacier
 Stoppani Glacier
 Yelcho Glacier

External links
 Chilean glacier inventory at Glaciologia.cl of Andrés Rivera

 
Chile
Glaciers